Mullakayevo (Mullaqay) is a rural locality (a village) in Novomullakayevsky Selsoviet, Karaidelsky District, Bashkortostan, Russia. The population was 108 as of 2010. There are 3 streets.

Geography 
Mullakayevo is located 24 km northeast of Karaidel (the district's administrative centre) by road. Novomullakayevo is the nearest rural locality.

References 

Rural localities in Karaidelsky District